Mary Ball (1818–1849) was a Nuneaton housewife who poisoned her husband with arsenic.  She was hanged in Cuckoo Lane, outside Coventry Gaol, before a crowd of about twenty thousand.  She was the last person to be publicly executed in Coventry.

A plaque on the former County Hall in Coventry marks the nearby site of her execution.

References

1818 births
1849 deaths
1849 murders in the United Kingdom
19th-century executions by England and Wales
English people convicted of murder
British female murderers
People convicted of murder by England and Wales